Vedire Ramachandra Reddy (1905-1986) was, in 1951, the first landlord to donate land to the poor as part of the Bhoodan movement in southern India.

Reddy, a social worker, received the title Bhoodan because of his role in starting the land donation movement of early 1950s in Andhra Pradesh at a village called Pochampally in the Nalgonda district. Acharya Vinobha Bhave, under the guidance of Mahatma Gandhi, started the land donation movement in Pochampally village in April 1951. Eventually, 1 million acres (4,000 km²) of land was donated and distributed among the poor in post-independence India.

Reddy was born on July 13, 1905, into a prominent family during the Nizam Rule in Deccan. He completed his law/barrister training at Ferguson Law college in Pune. After practicing law for a few years, he resigned, began to work for social reform, and helped initiate the land donation movement in Pochampally.

Reddy died on December 9, 1986.

References

External links
 Bhoodan-Gramdan Movement - 50 Years : A Review

1905 births
1986 deaths
20th-century Indian philanthropists
Indian landlords